Bacalar is one of the ten municipalities of the Mexican state of Quintana Roo.  The municipal seat and most populous town is the eponymous Bacalar.  The municipality was formed on February 2, 2011, when it separated from the Municipality of Othón P. Blanco.

Major communities
The 2010 census enumerated 57 populated localities.

References

External links
 
 Official website

Municipalities of Quintana Roo